The Central Baptist Church at 515 N. 4th Street in Muskogee, Oklahoma was a historic Baptist church building.  It was built in 1908 and added to the National Register of Historic Places in 1984.

The building was demolished in 1985 for Arrowhead Mall.

It was a  one-story building with a hipped roof and two-story towers at north and south ends of its east-facing front.  It was listed on the National Register as part of a multiple property submission for Black Protestant churches in Muskogee.

References

African-American history of Oklahoma
Baptist churches in Oklahoma
Churches on the National Register of Historic Places in Oklahoma
Churches completed in 1908
Buildings and structures in Muskogee, Oklahoma
National Register of Historic Places in Muskogee County, Oklahoma
1908 establishments in Oklahoma
Demolished buildings and structures in Oklahoma
Buildings and structures demolished in 1985